Empis decora is a species of fly in the family Empididae. It is included in the subgenus Empis. It is found in the  Palearctic.

References

Empis
Insects described in 1822
Asilomorph flies of Europe